The Pseudophyllodromiinae are a subfamily of cockroaches, in the family Ectobiidae, with a world-wide distribution.

Well known species include:
 Small yellow cockroach Cariblatta lutea
 Brown-banded cockroach Supella longipalpa
 Eastern ellipsidion Ellipsidion australe

Genera

The Cockroach Species File lists:

 Afrobalta Princis, 1969
 Afroneura Princis, 1963
 Aglaopteryx Hebard, 1917
 Agmoblatta Gurney & Roth, 1966
 Allacta Saussure & Zehntner, 1895
 Amazonina Hebard, 1929
 Apteroblatta Shelford, 1910
 Arawakina Hebard, 1926
 Asemoblattana Strand, 1929
 Balta Tepper 1893
 Cariblatta Hebard, 1916
 Cariblattella Lopes & Oliveira, 2007
 Cariblattoides Rehn & Hebard, 1927
 Ceratinoptera Brunner von Wattenwyl, 1865
 Chorisoblatta Shelford, 1911
 Chorisomaculata Lopes & Oliveira, 2010
 Chorisoneura Brunner von Wattenwyl, 1865
 Chorisoneurodes Princis, 1962
 Chorisoserrata Roth, 1998
 Delosia Bolívar, 1924
 Dendroblatta Rehn, 1916
 Desmosia Bolívar, 1895
 Doradoblatta Bruijning, 1959
 Ellipsidion Saussure, 1863
 Epibalta Princis, 1974
 Euphyllodromia Shelford, 1908
 Euthlastoblatta Hebard, 1917
 Helgaia Rocha e Silva & Gurney, 1963
 Hypnornoides Rehn, 1917
 Imblattella Bruijning, 1959
 Isoldaia Gurney & Roth, 1966
 Latiblattella Hebard, 1917
 Leuropeltis Hebard, 1921
 Lophoblatta Hebard, 1929
 Lupparia Walker, 1868
 Macrophyllodromia Saussure & Zehntner, 1893
 Margattea Shelford, 1911
 Margatteoidea Princis, 1959
 Matabelina Princis, 1955
 Mediastinia Hebard, 1943
 Megamareta Hebard, 1943
 Nahublattella Bruijning, 1959
 Neoblattella Shelford, 1911
 Pachnepteryx Brunner von Wattenwyl, 1865
 Paranocticola Bonfils, 1977
 Phidon Rehn, 1933
 Plectoptera Saussure, 1864
 Prosoplecta Saussure, 1864
 Pseudectobia Saussure, 1869
 Pseudobalta Roth, 1997
 Pseudophyllodromia Brunner von Wattenwyl, 1865
 Pseudosymploce Rehn & Hebard, 1927
 Rhytidometopum Hebard, 1920
 Riatia Walker, 1868
 Shelfordina Hebard, 1929
 Sliferia Roth, 1989
 Sorineuchora Caudell, 1927
 Squamoptera Bruijning, 1948
 Sundablatta Hebard, 1929
 Supella Shelford, 1911
 Supellina Chopard, 1921
 Tagaloblatta Lucañas, 2016
 Tomeisneria Roth, 1994
 Trioblattella Bruijning, 1959

References

External links
 
 

Cockroaches